Mehmana is a village de facto in the Martakert Province of the breakaway Republic of Artsakh, de jure in the Kalbajar District of Azerbaijan, in the disputed region of Nagorno-Karabakh.

History 
Metal ore has historically been mined in the area of the village, including silver and lead. From the beginning of the 19th century, Pontic Greeks from present-day Turkey settled in Mehmana, with many coming to mine the ore found in the area. 

During the Soviet period, the village was part of the Mardakert District of the Nagorno-Karabakh Autonomous Oblast. During the First Nagorno-Karabakh War, the village was captured by Azerbaijani forces during the Mardakert and Martuni Offensives, and was almost completely destroyed, with the population fleeing and many moving to Greece. After the war, Artsakh rebuilt six houses in the village. As of 2010, only one Greek resident remains in Mehmana.

Historical heritage sites 
Historical heritage sites in and around the village include tombs from the 2nd–1st millennia BCE, a 12th/13th-century cemetery, the church of Surb Astvatsatsin built in 1228, the Panaya Church built in 1249, and a 13th-century khachkar.

Economy and culture 
The population is mainly engaged in agriculture and animal husbandry. As of 2015, the village has a municipal building, and an aid station.

Demographics 
The village had 27 inhabitants in 2005, and 26 inhabitants in 2015.

Gallery

References

External links 

 

Populated places in Martakert Province
Populated places in Kalbajar District